The 2020–21 Morehead State Eagles men's basketball team represented Morehead State University in the 2020–21 NCAA Division I men's basketball season. The Eagles, led by fourth-year head coach Preston Spradlin, played their home games at Ellis Johnson Arena in Morehead, Kentucky as members of the Ohio Valley Conference. They finished the season 23-8, 17-3 in OVC Play to finish in 2nd place. They defeated Southeast Missouri State, Eastern Kentucky, and Belmont to be champions of the OVC tournament. They received the conference’s automatic bid to the NCAA tournament where they lost in the first round to West Virginia.

Previous season
The Eagles finished the 2019–20 season 13–19, 7–11 in OVC play to finish in eighth place. They lost in the first round of the OVC tournament to Tennessee State.

Roster

Schedule and results 

|-
!colspan=12 style=| Regular season

|-
!colspan=9 style=|Ohio Valley tournament

|-
!colspan=9 style=|NCAA tournament

Sources

References

Morehead State Eagles men's basketball seasons
Morehead State Eagles
Morehead State Eagles men's basketball
Morehead State Eagles men's basketball
Morehead State